Sir William Drury (2 October 152713 October 1579) was an English statesman and soldier.

Family
William Drury, born at Hawstead in Suffolk on 2 October 1527, was the third son of Sir Robert Drury (c. 1503–1577) of Hedgerley, Buckinghamshire, and Elizabeth Brudenell, of Chalfont St Peter, Buckinghamshire. He was the grandson of another Sir Robert Drury (c. 1456–2 March 1535), Speaker of the House of Commons in 1495. He was a brother of Sir Robert Drury (1525–1593) and Sir Drue Drury (1531/2–1617).

Career
Drury was educated at Gonville College, Cambridge. Fighting in France, Drury was taken prisoner in 1544; then after his release, he helped Lord Russell, afterwards Earl of Bedford, to quell a rising in Devonshire in 1549, but he did not come to the front until the reign of Elizabeth I.

In 1554 he sat as Member of Parliament for Chipping Wycombe. In 1559, he was sent to Edinburgh to report on the condition of Scottish politics, and five years later he became Marshal and deputy-governor of Berwick-upon-Tweed. He was a close observer of the affairs of Mary, Queen of Scots and her house-arrest in Loch Leven Castle, was in constant communication with Lord Burghley and wrote to him on 3 April 1568 regarding her escape from that place on 25 March, about which he gave a full account.

He went to Scotland with Sir Henry Gates and met Regent Moray in the Great Hall of Stirling Castle on 19 January 1570, and they had a discussion in his bedchamber after dinner. Moray was proceeding to keep an appointment with Drury in Linlithgow when he was mortally wounded, and it was probably intended that Drury should be murdered also.

After this event, Drury led two raids into Scotland; at least thrice he went to that country on more peaceable errands, during which, however, his life was continually in danger from assassins. As ambassador with Thomas Randolph in April 1572 he stayed at Restalrig Deanery. There he plotted with Archibald Douglas to kidnap George, Lord Seton from the shore at Leith, but the plan did not take effect. In May 1573 he commanded the force which compelled Edinburgh Castle to surrender. A year later, a letter from the defeated and executed commander of the castle, William Kirkcaldy of Grange came to light, which mentioned the jewels Mary, Queen of Scots had left behind in Scotland, and that Drury had taken some for a loan of £600. During the 1573 siege Drury billeted at the house of Robert Gourlay on the Royal Mile, a few hundred metres from the castle.

In 1576, he was sent to Ireland as President of Munster, where his rule was severe but effective, and in 1578 he became Lord Justice of Ireland, taking the chief control of affairs after the departure of Sir Henry Sidney. The Second Desmond Rebellion had just broken out when Sir William died in October 1579.

Drury's letters to Cecil, and others, are invaluable for the story of the relations between England and Scotland at this time.

His house in London gave its name to the street Drury Lane.

Marriage and issue

On 10 October 1560 at St Alphage London Wall Drury married Margery Wentworth (died 1587), widow of John Williams, 1st Baron Williams of Thame, and daughter of Thomas Wentworth, 1st Baron Wentworth of Nettlestead, Suffolk, by whom he had three daughters:

Jane Drury, who married Sir Richard Chetwood, son of Richard Chetwood and Agnes Wodehull.
Anne Drury, who married Robert Hartwell, esquire.
Elizabeth Drury, who was born 12 December and baptized 29 December 1573 at Long Crendon, Buckinghamshire, with Queen Elizabeth I, Lady Wentworth, and Robert Dudley, 1st Earl of Leicester, as godparents. Elizabeth Drury married William Cecil, 2nd Earl of Exeter and from this union descended the Earls of Berkshire.

After Drury's death, his widow married, in 1580, James Croft (died 4 September 1624), the third son of Sir James Croft of Croft Castle, Herefordshire. Croft had served as a captain under Margaret's second husband, Sir William Drury, in 1578–9.  The couple settled on property in Weston-on-the-Green, Oxfordshire, which had come to Margaret through her first marriage.

References

Further reading

 
 
 

Attribution
 The History of the Family of Drury, by Arthur Campling, F.S.A., London, 1937, p. 102.

External links

 Robert Drury (by 1503–1577), History of Parliament
 Drury, Sir William, TudorPlace
The Plantagenet Roll of the Blood Royal - Clarence Volume by the Marquis of Ruvigny and Raineval

1527 births
1579 deaths
People from Hawstead
Alumni of Gonville and Caius College, Cambridge
People of Elizabethan Ireland
People of the Scottish Marian Civil War
English MPs 1554–1555
English knights
16th-century English soldiers
16th-century English diplomats
People of the Second Desmond Rebellion